Madawaska—Victoria was a federal electoral district in New Brunswick, Canada, that was represented in the House of Commons of Canada from 1968 to 1997.

The riding consisted of Madawaska and Victoria Counties, which until 1966 had been part of Restigouche—Madawaska and Victoria—Carleton respectively. The district's boundaries did not change during its 30 years. With the 1996 redistribution, most of Madawaska County was placed in the revived Madawaska—Restigouche, while Victoria County became part of Tobique—Mactaquac riding.

Bernard Valcourt, the only non-Liberal ever elected from this riding, served several positions in Brian Mulroney's cabinet between 1988 and 1993.

Members of Parliament

This riding elected the following Members of Parliament:

Election results 

|-
 
|Liberal
|Pierrette Ringuette
|align="right"|16,058
|align="right"|48.8
|align="right"|+5.0
|-
 
| style="width: 150px" |Progressive Conservative
|Bernard Valcourt
|align="right"|15,045
|align="right"|45.7
|align="right"|-2.5
|-

|-

|New Democratic Party
|Parise Martin
|align="right"|844
|align="right"|2.6
|align="right"|-5.4
|- bgcolor="white"
!align="left" colspan=3|Total
!align="right"|32,902
!align="right"|
!align="right"|

|-
 
| style="width: 150px" |Progressive Conservative
|Bernard Valcourt
|align="right"|14,747
|align="right"|48.2
|align="right"|-3.7
|-
 
|Liberal
|Romeo Rossignol
|align="right"|13,385
|align="right"|43.8
|align="right"|+1.9
|-

|New Democratic Party
|Réal Couturier
|align="right"|2,441
|align="right"|8.0
|align="right"|+1.8
|- bgcolor="white"
!align="left" colspan=3|Total
!align="right"|30,573
!align="right"|
!align="right"|

|-
 
| style="width: 150px" |Progressive Conservative
|Bernard Valcourt
|align="right"|16,411
|align="right"|51.9
|align="right"|+29.0
|-
 
|Liberal
|Gerald Clavette
|align="right"|13,245
|align="right"|41.9
|align="right"|-23.9
|-

|New Democratic Party
|Floranne McLaughlin-St-Amand
|align="right"|1,968
|align="right"|6.2
|align="right"|-5.1
|- bgcolor="white"
!align="left" colspan=3|Total
!align="right"|31,624
!align="right"|
!align="right"|

|-
 
|Liberal
|Eymard Corbin
|align="right"|17,190
|align="right"|65.8
|align="right"|+4.0
|-
 
| style="width: 150px" |Progressive Conservative
|Gerald Akerley
|align="right"|5,979
|align="right"|22.9
|align="right"|-9.0
|-

|New Democratic Party
|James Aucoin
|align="right"|2,943
|align="right"|11.3
|align="right"|+5.0
|- bgcolor="white"
!align="left" colspan=3|Total
!align="right"|26,112
!align="right"|
!align="right"|

|-
 
|Liberal
|Eymard Corbin
|align="right"|15,851
|align="right"|61.8
|align="right"|-2.5
|-
 
| style="width: 150px" |Progressive Conservative
|Roger Guimond
|align="right"|8,171
|align="right"|31.9
|align="right"|+0.3
|-

|New Democratic Party
|James Aucoin
|align="right"|1,620
|align="right"|6.3
|align="right"|+2.2
|- bgcolor="white"
!align="left" colspan=3|Total
!align="right"|25,642
!align="right"|
!align="right"|

|-
 
|Liberal
|Eymard Corbin
|align="right"|14,310
|align="right"|64.3
|align="right"|+9.0
|-
 
| style="width: 150px" |Progressive Conservative
|Warren Winchester
|align="right"|7,023
|align="right"|31.6
|align="right"|-5.6
|-

|New Democratic Party
|Peter Hanson
|align="right"|906
|align="right"|4.1
|align="right"|-3.3
|- bgcolor="white"
!align="left" colspan=3|Total
!align="right"|22,239
!align="right"|
!align="right"|

|-
 
|Liberal
|Eymard Corbin
|align="right"|13,104
|align="right"|55.3
|align="right"|+5.3
|-
 
| style="width: 150px" |Progressive Conservative
|Lawrence Fyfe
|align="right"|8,822
|align="right"|37.2
|align="right"|-10.9
|-

|New Democratic Party
|Conrad Audet
|align="right"|1,763
|align="right"|7.4
|align="right"|+5.5
|- bgcolor="white"
!align="left" colspan=3|Total
!align="right"|23,689
!align="right"|
!align="right"|

|-
 
|Liberal
|Eymard Corbin
|align="right"|9,924
|align="right"|50.0
|align="right"|*
|-
 
| style="width: 150px" |Progressive Conservative
|Jean-Maurice Simard
|align="right"|9,541
|align="right"|48.1
|align="right"|*
|-

|New Democratic Party
|George Young
|align="right"|379
|align="right"|1.9
|align="right"|*
|- bgcolor="white"
!align="left" colspan=3|Total
!align="right"|19,844
!align="right"|
!align="right"|

See also 

 List of Canadian federal electoral districts
 Past Canadian electoral districts

External links
 Website of the Parliament of Canada
 Riding history from the Library of Parliament

Former federal electoral districts of New Brunswick